General Bennett may refer to:

Donald V. Bennett (1915–2005), U.S. Army four-star general
Donald W. Bennett (born 1927), U.S. Air Force major general
Gordon Bennett (general) (1887–1962), Australian Army lieutenant general
Juan Pablo Bennett (1871–1951), Chilean Army general
Phillip Bennett (born 1928), Australian Army general
Thomas W. Bennett (territorial governor) (1831–1893), Union Army brevet brigadier general

See also
John Bradbury Bennet (1865–1930), U.S. Army brigadier general
Attorney General Bennett (disambiguation)